DFS Kopernikus (meaning Deutscher Fernmeldesatellit Kopernikus) was the name of three geostationary satellites of Deutsche Bundespost and later Deutsche Telekom AG. They are no longer in use.

DFS Kopernicus-3 
When DFS Kopernikus-3 was nearing the end of its life, SES sealed an agreement with Deutsche Telekom to use the 23.5° East position and frequencies, and in August 2001, Astra 1D was moved there. The Astra 23.5°E position was officially opened in March 2002 with the launch and positioning of Astra 3A. Deutsche Telekom contracted for 10 transponders on that craft and shortly switched over all traffic from DFS Kopernikus-3.

Station keeping 
The orbital station-keeping manoeuvres of the satellites were conducted by the Flight Dynamics Group of the German Aerospace Center (DLR), German Space Operations Center, in Oberpfaffenhofen, Bavaria. The satellites were located at the following positions:

 DFS Kopernikus-1: 23.5° East (1989-1994), later 33.5° East (1994-2002), replaced by Astra 3A 
 DFS Kopernikus-2: 28.5° East (1994–2000?)
 DFS Kopernikus-3: 23.5° East (1994–2003)

German satellite television market share in 1990 
 SES: ca. 80%
 DFS Kopernikus: ca. 20%
 TV-SAT 2: under 1%

See also 

 Nicolaus Copernicus
 Astra 23.5°E
 Astra 3A

References

External links 
 DFS Kopernikus in GSOC
 DFS Kopernikus
 ASTRA 3A
 SES fleet information and map
 SES Astra website
 Official SES trade/industry site

Kopernikus
Deutsche Telekom